Ran Samanalayo (Sinhala: රන් සමනළයෝ) is a Sri Lankan television drama broadcast by Independent Television Network. The series first aired on 8 June 2011 and concluded on 25 May 2012. This is a mega hit of Sandaruwan Jayawickrama after Sulanga. Ran Samanalayo has been rated by many surveys as the most popular teledrama at 8:00pm. Actor Saranga Disasekara was awarded as the most popular actor of the year 2011 at Raigam Tele'es for his acting in this teledrama. Ran Samanalayo is special for its attractive color combination of costumes and other relevant things.

Story
Samanali, an innocent beautiful girl in her twenties works as a dancing teacher of a convent. She lives with her mother and grandmother. Her grandmother always accuses Samanali's mother due to a past incident. So Samanali is worrying about that and also she thinks that she has a big responsibility of her mother's and grandmother's lives. So she is living a strict life and she hasn't had any close relationship with a boy.

But Sihina is a rich handsome boy, enjoying his life freely. He just came back from abroad after completing his studies. Meanwhile, the convent, where Samanali works is going to organize a concert. So teachers have a tough time to get ready for that and they also try to find a sponsor in order to get a financial support. Then Sihina comes forward to take that responsibility. One day he comes to the convent for that matter. He accidentally sees Samanali and falls in love from the first sight. This is the start of the story.

Cast and characters
Pubudu Chathuranga as Sihina
Asha Edirisinghe as Samanali
Roshan Ranawana as Deneth
Saranga Disasekara as Nilanga
Sachini Ayendra as Menuka aka Menu
Mihira Sirithilaka as Chethiya
Robin Fernando as Devanarayana aka Deva
Sriyani Amarasena as Vinitha
Janak Premalal as Prem
Sajeewa Malmarachchi as Seththi
Thushara Jayasuriya as Wicky
Seetha Kumari

Music
Theme Song: Thurul Wenna Asai Hendewe by Bathiya and Santhush

Awards
 Most popular actor of the year 2011 (Raigam Tele'es): Saranga Disasekara

Songs
 Sundarai Aththamai Jeewithe Oba Thamai
 Eka Malakwath Suwanda Na Oba Tharam

See also
 Independent Television Network
 Bonda Meedum (Teledrama)

References

External links
 Official website 
 Facebook (Ran Samanalayo – Teledrama)
 YouTube (Ran Samanalayo – Theme Song (Thurul wenna asai handawe...))
 ITN glitters at the Raigam Tele’es again winning the highest number of Awards

Sri Lankan television shows
Sri Lankan drama television series
2011 Sri Lankan television series debuts
2012 Sri Lankan television series endings
2010s Sri Lankan television series
Independent Television Network original programming